Andrei Borisovich Kolesnikov (born 6 February 1977) is a Russian major-general (one-star rank) who according to Ukraine was killed in the 2022 Russian invasion of Ukraine. Kolesnikov's death has not been confirmed by the Russian Federation. On 14 March 2023, Kolesnikov appeared in an interview with Vladimir Soloviev on Russian TV.

Biography 
Born in Oktyabrskoye, Voronezh Oblast, on 6 February 1977, Kolesnikov graduated from a tank college in Kazan (1999), the Combined Arms Academy of the Armed Forces of the Russian Federation (2008), and the Military Academy of the General Staff of the Armed Forces of Russia (2020). In 2010, Kolesnikov was a lieutenant colonel and serving as chief of staff of the 4th Guards Tank Division. He was promoted to the rank of major-general and appointed, in December 2021, the former commander of the 29th Combined Arms Army of the Eastern Military District in the Zabaykalsky Krai.

Invasion of Ukraine 
Kolesnikov took part in the 2022 Russian invasion of Ukraine. According to Ukrainian officials, he was killed in Mariupol on 11 March 2022. NATO officials confirmed that a Russian commander from Russia's eastern military district became the second Russian general officer to be killed in the hostilities (after Andrei Sukhovetsky), but did not specify his name. However, the Ukrainian claim has not been verified by Western media and Russian sources have not confirmed his death. On 14 March 2023, Kolesnikov appeared in an interview with Vladimir Soloviev on Russian TV, reportedly during Soloviev's trip to Syria.

See also 
 List of Russian generals killed during the 2022 invasion of Ukraine

References

1977 births
People from Povorinsky District
Russian lieutenant generals
Russian major generals
Russian military personnel of the 2022 Russian invasion of Ukraine
Siege of Mariupol
Eastern Ukraine offensive
Zhukov Air and Space Defence Academy alumni
Military Academy of the General Staff of the Armed Forces of Russia alumni
20th-century Russian military personnel
21st-century Russian military personnel
Possibly living people